The 2016 Nebraska Danger season was the sixth season for the Nebraska Danger as a professional indoor football franchise and their sixth in the Indoor Football League (IFL). One of ten teams competing in the IFL for the 2016 season, the Nebraska Danger were members of the Intense Conference. For the fifth consecutive year, the team played their home games under head coach Mike Davis in the Eihusen Arena at the Heartland Events Center in Grand Island, Nebraska.

Schedule
Key:

Pre-season

Regular season
All start times are local time

Standings

Postseason

Roster

References

External links
 Nebraska Danger official website
 Nebraska Danger official statistics
 Nebraska Danger at The Grand Island Independent

Nebraska Danger
Nebraska Danger
Nebraska Danger